Theophania (Greek for "Manifestation of God" or "Epiphany") may refer to:

 Theophania ("On Divine Manifestation"), a  Greek theological work by Eusebius
 Theophanu or Theophania (960-991), Byzantine princess and Empress of the Holy Roman Empire
 Theophano Martinakia (died 893), first wife of Leo VI the Wise
 Feofaniya or Theophania, a park near Kyiv, Ukraine

See also
 Theophany, the appearance or manifestation of a deity to mortals
 Epiphany (holiday), a holiday celebrating the theophany of Jesus Christ 
 Tiffany (given name), an English form of the given name Theophania
 Theophanes (disambiguation) or Feofan, a related masculine given name
 Theophano (disambiguation), another form of the given name

Theophoric names